= 12/10 =

12/10 may refer to:

- December 10 (month-day date notation)
- October 12 (day-month date notation)
- 12 shillings and 10 pence in UK predecimal currency
